Hyposidra is a genus of moths in the family Geometridae first described by Achille Guenée in 1857.

Description
Palpi hairy and reaching beyond the frons. Antennae of male usually bipectinate (comb like on both sides) with long branches to three-fourths length. Hind tibia rarely dilated and fringed with hair. Forewings of male with fovea. The costa arched towards apex, which is much produced. Vein 3 from just before angle of cell. The discocellulars angled below vein 5. Veins 7 to 9 stalked, from before upper angle and curved. Veins 10 and 11 usually stalked. Female with costa evenly arched. The outer margin excised below apex. Vein 3 from angle of cell and vein 5 obsolescent. Vein 10 and 11 coincident. Hindwings with vein 3 from angle of cell.

Species
Some species of this genus are:
Hyposidra altiviolescens (Holloway, 1993) — Borneo
Hyposidra apicifulva (Warren, 1907) — New Guinea
Hyposidra apioleuca (Prout, 1916) — Peninsular Malaysia, Sumatra & Borneo
Hyposidra aquilaria (Walker, [1863]) — China to Borneo
Hyposidra castaneorufa (Rothschild 1915) — New Guinea
Hyposidra incomptaria (Walker, 1866) — Malaysia to Solomons
Hyposidra infixaria (Walker, 1860) — Himalaya to Taiwan and Sundaland
Hyposidra janiaria (Guenée, 1857) — Java to Australia
Hyposidra leucomela (Walker, 1866) — Philippines
Hyposidra nigricosta (Warren, 1896) — Indonesia/Moluccas
Hyposidra picaria (Walker, 1866) — Sundaland
Hyposidra plagosa (Rothschild, 1915) — New Guinea
Hyposidra rufosarcuata (Holloway, 1993) — Sumatra & Borneo
Hyposidra talaca (Walker, 1860) — India to Solomons
Hyposidra violescens (Hampson, 1895) — Himalaya to Borneo

Former species
Hyposidra muscula Bastelberger, 1911

References

Holloway. The Moths of Borneo - Part XI.

Boarmiini